The Central District of Lahijan County is a district (bakhsh) in Lahijan County, Gilan Province, Iran. At the 2006 census, its population was 130,288, in 38,766 families.  The District has one city: Lahijan. The District has five rural districts (dehestan): Ahandan Rural District, Baz Kia Gurab Rural District, Lafmejan Rural District, Layalestan Rural District, and Layl Rural District.

References 

Lahijan County
Districts of Gilan Province